Xaló, is a municipality in the comarca of Marina Alta in the Valencian Community, Spain.

Geography 
The town of Jalón is located in the Jalón Valley.

Climate 
Jalón's climate is mild with mild winters and bearable summers due to its proximity of the Mediterranean Sea. The rainiest month is usually October.

Main sights
 Route of the Valencian classics

References

Municipalities in the Province of Alicante